The Knearl School, at 314 S. Clayton St. in Brush, Colorado, was listed on the National Register of Historic Places in 1997. It was used as a school until 1971.

The school served about 100 students each year, usually in just grades 1 to 3, in years before 1964, when students had dropped to around 30 in total.  It largely served the sugar beet farming workforce, which grew rapidly to staff a new facility in Brush opened by the Great Western Sugar Company.

It was named for William Knearl, a business leader and president of the school board, who donated the land for the school.

It is the first stop in a walking tour of Brush's historic sites, whose brochure notes that it became the Brush Area Museum and Cultural Center in 2005.

A 1999 study, the "Rural School Buildings in Colorado Multiple Property Submission" set standards for historic registration of schools like this.

See also
Lincoln School (Fort Morgan, Colorado), of similar appearance, also NRHP-listed in Morgan County

References

Schools in Colorado
National Register of Historic Places in Morgan County, Colorado
Buildings and structures completed in 1911